In enzymology, an arylamine N-acetyltransferase is an enzyme that catalyzes the chemical reaction

acetyl-CoA + an arylamine  CoA + an N-acetylarylamine

Thus, the two substrates of this enzyme are acetyl-CoA and arylamine, whereas its two products are CoA and N-acetylarylamine.

This enzyme belongs to the family of transferases, specifically those acyltransferases transferring groups other than aminoacyl groups.  The systematic name of this enzyme class is acetyl-CoA:arylamine N-acetyltransferase. Other names in common use include arylamine acetylase, beta-naphthylamine N-acetyltransferase, 4-aminobiphenyl N-acetyltransferase, acetyl CoA-arylamine N-acetyltransferase, 2-naphthylamine N-acetyltransferase, arylamine acetyltransferase, indoleamine N-acetyltransferase, N-acetyltransferase, p-aminosalicylate N-acetyltransferase, serotonin acetyltransferase, and serotonin N-acetyltransferase.

Structural studies

References

 
 
 
 

EC 2.3.1
Enzymes of known structure